Zardband or Zardeband or 'Zard Band may refer to:
 Zardband, Tehran